The men's 10 kilometre classical at the 2011 Asian Winter Games was held on February 3, 2011 at Biathlon and Cross-Country Ski Complex, Almaty.

Schedule
All times are Almaty Time (UTC+06:00)

Results

References

Results FIS

External links
Official website

Men 10